The Committee for the Defence of Democracy, CDD (KOD) is a Polish-born civic organization and NGO which among its goals includes promoting the European values, especially democracy, rule of law, and human rights. It was founded in November 2015 by a group of citizens including Mateusz Kijowski, as a result of, and triggered by, the Polish constitutional crisis, 2015. The organization declares its independence of any political parties and that it has no intention to transform into one. It is opposed to the actions of the government led by the Law and Justice (PiS) party.

KOD has its Polish headquarters in Warsaw and international office in Brussels (KOD International), with chapters and affiliated associations around Europe, in North America, Asia and Australia.

The organization was awarded the 2016 European Citizens' Prize by the European Parliament for defending fundamental rights and democracy.

Background

KOD was formed after Law and Justice won parliament election. In opposition to several actions taken by the governing party, Law and Justice (PiS), which in October 2015 became the first party in post-communist Polish history to control an absolute majority of the seats in the Polish Parliament, with a PiS-backed candidate, Andrzej Duda, winning the presidential elections just a few months earlier. The primary impetus for the formation of KOD was the Parliament's enactment of a law on 26 November 2015 purporting to invalidate the prior Government's appointment of five judges to the Polish Constitutional Court and the nomination of new PiS-affiliated judges to replace them. Since then the organisation has opposed and reacted to any actions taken by the government or President Andrzej Duda which were deemed unlawful, undermining democracy, limiting civil liberties or going against European principles.

Activity
On 26 November 2015, the members of KOD wrote an open letter entitled "A Letter of the Citizens of the Constitutional State to Andrzej Duda, the President of Poland" asking him to swear in three of the five judges to the Constitutional Court. KOD argued that those three, although not the other two, were duly elected by the previous parliament.

As the disagreements between the governing party and the Constitutional Court continued, KOD called for protests against what it perceives as a breach of the Constitution in violation of democratic norms and the constitutional separation of powers between the legislature, executive branch, and judiciary.

The former leader, Mateusz Kijowski, left the organisation in 2017  after being accused of appropriating 121 thousand złoty.

 Demonstration, which was estimated by Der Spiegel and Le Monde to include 50,000 demonstrators, and at between 17,000 and 20,000 people by the police, took place in front of the headquarters of the Constitutional Court in Warsaw on 12 December 2015. Parallel demonstrations were also held in other major Polish cities, including: Poznań (over 2,000 people), Szczecin (over 2,000 people), Wrocław (approx. 2,000 people), Lublin (500), and Bielsko-Biała (200).
 On 13 December 2015, over 3,000 people demonstrated in Gdańsk.. 
 On 9 January 2016, there were demonstrations on the "Free Media" in 20 cities in Poland. 
 On 23 January 2016, 40 cities and towns in Poland saw protests about "Defense of Your freedom". 
 A demonstration with 70,000 people was held in Warsaw on 27 February; it was called "We, the People".
 A demonstration under the theme "We are and will remain in Europe" took place on 7 May in Warsaw and was estimated to gather up to 240,000 people by City Hall.

Most of the protests in Poland are accompanied by smaller protests by KOD cells in most European capitals and around the world, notably in Brussels, London, Paris, Berlin and the USA.

In December 2019, the Helsinki Foundation for Human Rights and the Committee for the Defence of Democracy organized protests throughout Poland against the Polish judicial disciplinary panel law.

Leadership
The original leader was Mateusz Kijowski (2015-2017).
In September 2020,  was re-elected as the head of KOD.

See also 

 2015–present Polish constitutional crisis
 Citizens of Poland
 Liberalism in Poland

References

External links

2015 establishments in Poland
Democracy movements
Organizations established in 2015
Politics of Poland
Political opposition organizations
Political organisations based in Poland
Protests in Poland
Recipients of the European Citizen's Prize